Home Sweet Home is a 2005 Hong Kong horror film directed by Cheang Pou-soi, starring Karena Lam, Shu Qi, Alex Fong and Lam Suet.

Plot
May moves into a new apartment in Hong Kong with her husband Ray and son Chi-lo. While they are moving in, Chi-lo and May see a hideous creature. They tell Ray what they have seen and he suggests moving out. However, as they have already paid a lot for their new home, May and her family decide to stay.

One day, May brings Chi-lo to a neighbour's birthday party. During this time, Chi-lo is kidnapped by the creature, which is revealed to be an deformed, insane woman who has mistaken the boy for her son. After informing the police, May and Ray begin searching the complex. In the parking garage, Ray is stabbed by the woman with a makeshift knife. Critically wounded, he is rushed to the hospital.

With her neighbours refusing to help, May is forced to continue the search alone. While searching the complex's air ducts and nearly being attacked by the woman, she falls through a vent cover leading to the outside of the complex and gets knocked out upon hitting the ground. A second attempt involves the help of a dog, which quickly picks up the woman's scent and tracks her to a rooftop. The dog scares Chi-lo and is killed by the woman, but not before it bites off one of her fingers. When May arrives, she ends up collecting the severed finger from the dog's mouth.

May then brings the finger to a police detective working on the case. Through fingerprint testing, they are able to identify the woman as one Chan Yim-hung, who lived with her husband and son Wing-man, as well as Hong Kong's poorest residents, in the same area of the apartment complex years ago when it still a squatter area. When the government tried to reclaim the area, a riot ensued and Chan's husband was killed in a subsequent explosion. Although the squatter area had been cleared, Chan had returned there with her son to continue their lives. After her son was killed by falling debris while looking for food, Chan left the area and returned some time after the new apartment was completed. By then, she had been driven insane by the loss of her son.

May decides to lure Chan out by printing copies of her photos and throwing them in the complex's air ducts. Chan sees the photos and attacks May in her apartment, ordering May to return her son. While May tries to tell her that her son had died years ago, Chi-lo arrives and Chan takes him out of the apartment while driving back May. Back in the complex's utility systems, Chan sees a vision of her dead husband, begging her to let go of their "home" that no longer exists. Upon seeing a reflection of herself in the glass door of an electrical grid, she smashes it, causing a blackout throughout the entire complex.

Once May sees a cloth belonging to Chi-lo floating down from the sky, she quickly realises they are on the rooftop. After squeezing her way through the police who had been sent to investigate the blackout, she comes across Chan, who is preparing to jump off with Chi-lo. May quickly stops them and attacks Chan for kidnapping and traumatising Chi-lo. While May and her son embrace, Chan plunges to her death, wanting to reunite with her family in the afterlife. As the screen goes black, Chi-lo can be heard asking, "Mom, would you abandon me?", to which May replies, "Of course not, not even if you abandon me."

Cast
Karena Lam as Chan Yim-hung
Shu Qi as May
Alex Fong as Ray Cheng
Lam Suet as Lo Wai
Ho Tam-chun as Cheng Chi-lo / Chan Wing-man
Matt Chow as Mr. Chan
Yan Chau-hin as Mrs Chan
Lisa Togo as Daisy Chan
Koan Hui as Mr Lok
Fanny Lee as Mrs Lok
Cheung Sin-ying as Lok's daughter
Rocky Li as Chan Kin-shing

References

External links

2005 films
2005 horror films
Hong Kong horror films
2000s Cantonese-language films
2000s Mandarin-language films
Films directed by Cheang Pou-soi
Films set in Hong Kong
Films shot in Hong Kong
Squatting in film
2000s Hong Kong films